Henk Visser   (born 1946) is a Dutch politician of the Reformatory Political Federation (RPF) and its successor the ChristianUnion (CU).

From 1984 to 1987, Visser was Party Chair of the RPF.

From 1990 to 1997, Visser was mayor of Arnemuiden, from 1997 to 2001 he was mayor of Nieuw-Lekkerland, and from 2001 to 2007 mayor of Elburg.

References

1946 births
Living people
Christian Union (Netherlands) politicians
21st-century Dutch politicians
Mayors in Zeeland
Mayors in Gelderland
People from Elburg
Mayors in South Holland
People from Nieuw-Lekkerland
Municipal councillors in Gelderland
Netherlands Reformed Churches Christians from the Netherlands
Party chairs of the Netherlands
Reformatory Political Federation politicians